Patrik Köbele (born 1962 in Weil am Rhein) is a German politician and leader of the German Communist Party (DKP).

Between 1989 and 1994, Köbele was leader of the Sozialistische Deutsche Arbeiterjugend (SDAJ), the DKP's youth organization. Between 2004 and 2009, he was member of the city council of Essen.

On 2 March 2013 he was elected leader of the DKP. Köbele won with 91 to 60 votes against former leader Bettina Jürgensen. Köbele defended the Berlin Wall and Inner German Border  as a guard in the 1980s and has stated that both were necessary for East Germany's security. For his service, he was awarded the Order of Karl Marx. 

Privately, Köbele lives in Essen with his two children and works as IT consultant. He has cited former East German leaders Erich Honecker, Willi Stoph, Hilde Benjamin and Erich Mielke as his childhood heroes. He is close friends with former East German leader Egon Krenz.

Footnotes

External links
 Einkünfte von Köbele laut DKP-Homepage

1962 births
People from Lörrach (district)
German Communist Party politicians
Living people